Bud Harless (born January 21, 1924 Gilbert, West Virginia, USA - died October 12, 2007) was a NASCAR Grand National Series driver.

Career
He raced for six years and in 28 races (with two finishes in the top ten). Harless' average starting position was 23rd while his average finishing position was 22nd. Total prize winnings for this driver were $6,255 ($ when adjusted for inflation). Harless was also a NASCAR owner who appeared in thirteen different races as a driver/owner and would be one of the earliest drivers to carry the #8 for his vehicle (which was suspended in 2010 due to lack of sponsorship; the last driver using this number was Aric Almirola) in what is now called the NASCAR Sprint Cup Series.

References

External links
 Insider Racing News

1924 births
2007 deaths
NASCAR drivers
NASCAR team owners
People from Gilbert, West Virginia
Racing drivers from West Virginia